John Petty may refer to:

John Petty (priest) (1935–2017), Anglican provost and Dean of Coventry
John Petty (Primitive Methodist minister) (1807–1868), 19th-century author and Primitive Methodist minister and first governor of Elmfield College
John Petty, 1st Earl of Shelburne (1706–1761),  politician, father to former prime minister of Great Britain, William Petty, 2nd Earl of Shelburne
John Petty, 2nd Marquess of Lansdowne (1765–1809), son of former prime minister of Great Britain, William Petty, 1st Marquess of Lansdowne
John Petty Jr., (born 1998), American basketball player
John Petty (American football), American football player

See also
John Pettie, Scottish painter